State Route 182 (SR 182) is a state highway in the U.S. state of Maine. While US 1 stays to the south passing through towns along Maine's coastline, SR 182 stays inland only passing through one town, Franklin, but otherwise passes through rural forested areas.

Route description
SR 182 begins in a small cluster of small commercial businesses along US 1 in Hancock. It heads northeast along Franklin Road passing houses, light industrial facilities, and wooded areas. It enters the town of Franklin passing through the settlement of Egypt. It then begins to follow the north side of the furthest reaches of Taunton Bay. After passing through the settlement of West Franklin, the road enters the town center of Franklin where SR 200 joins SR 182 for a  concurrency. Through this concurrency, the road passes numerous houses, churches, and small businesses. Past the point where SR 200 heads towards the southeast, SR 182 heads northeast, first crossing the Down East Sunrise Trail (formerly the Calais Branch railroad) then passes the town's post office, a cemetery, a club, and additional houses. The road starts to curve to the east entering the unorganized territory of East Hancock. Through the unorganized territory, SR 182 winds its way around numerous lakes (including Fox Pond, Spring River Lake, and Tunk Lake) and mountains (including Otter Bog Mountain, Tunk Mountain, and Catherine Mountain). The road then enters Cherryfield, Washington County where some homes appear along the road again. After crossing the aforementioned rail trail, SR 182 makes a sweeping curve to the south bypassing a former alignment of the road which stayed closer to the Narraguagus River. The highway ends at US 1 just west of the river and the town center.

Major junctions

References

External links

Floodgap Roadgap's RoadsAroundME: Maine State Route 182

182
Transportation in Hancock County, Maine
Transportation in Washington County, Maine